Ayers is an unincorporated community in Carroll County, Illinois, United States. Ayers is located along Illinois Route 84, south of Savanna.

References

Unincorporated communities in Carroll County, Illinois
Unincorporated communities in Illinois